Aspergillus subalbidus is a species of fungus in the genus Aspergillus. It is from the Candidi section. The species was first described in 2014.

Growth and morphology

A. subalbidus has been cultivated on both Czapek yeast extract agar (CYA) plates and Malt Extract Agar Oxoid® (MEAOX) plates. The growth morphology of the colonies can be seen in the pictures below.

References

subalbidus
Fungi described in 2014